Second-seeded JoAnne Russell and Virginia Ruzici won the title and $9,600 first-prize money after defeating Sue Barker and Paula Smith in the final.

Seeds
A champion seed is indicated in bold text while text in italics indicates the round in which that seed was eliminated.

Draw

Finals

Top half

Bottom half

References

External links

U.S. Clay Court Championships
1981 U.S. Clay Court Championships